The Nogeoldae ('Old Cathayan') is a textbook of colloquial northern Chinese published in Korea in several editions from the 14th to 18th centuries. The book is an important source on both Late Middle Korean and the history of Mandarin Chinese. Later editions were translated into Manchu and Mongolian.

Contents 
The word  (Korean ; Old Mandarin Khita) of the title, like the term Cathay, is a transcription of the Mongolian form of Khitan, a people who ruled northern China as the Liao dynasty (907–1125).
It became a common name throughout Asia for China and all things Chinese.
Here it means 'Chinese'.
The word  (Korean , literally 'old') had been used as a prefix indicating familiarity (as in modern Standard Chinese) since at least the Tang period.

The book mainly consists of dialogs centered on a journey of a Korean merchant to Beijing, and the Chinese travelers who join him on the way. It opens with the following lines:

After arriving in Beijing, they sell Korean commodities and purchase goods to sell back in Korea. The book concludes with the Korean merchant's departure from Beijing.

The book focuses on language used in travel, business, banquets, and medicine.  It also contains unique insights into life in Beijing, including the first instance of the word hutong (alley).

Later editions are accompanied by Korean-language annotation (諺解 ) interleaved with the text. Below each Chinese character are written two transcriptions in Hangul: a "left reading" taken from the "popular readings" in Shin Suk-ju's 1455 dictionary, and a "right reading" reflecting contemporary pronunciation. Each Chinese sentence is followed by a colloquial Korean translation, also written in Hangul.

The text below is from eonhae edition

Editions 

Five editions of the book exist, as it was revised over the centuries to follow changes in the northern Chinese vernacular and the Korean language.

The original Chinese edition seems have been written around the middle of the 14th century. The Nogeoldae and a similar text, Bak Tongsa ("Pak the interpreter"), were very popular, and are mentioned in Korean records of 1426 as required texts for government translators. An early 15th century copy discovered in Daegu in 1998 is believed to be close to the original version. It includes valuable information on the colloquial Old Mandarin of the Yuan dynasty, called "Han'er speech" in this book.

In 1480, the royal instructor ordered revisions of both textbooks to match the very different Middle Mandarin of the Ming dynasty. A Korean scholar, Choe Sejin, wrote a guidebook based on this edition in 1507–17.  This edition is now conventionally called the Beonyeok Nogeoldae ( "New Translation of the 'Old Cathayan'") to distinguish it from the original. The Korean versions of the dialogs are written in a colloquial style, giving unique insight into Late Middle Korean.

A third edition, the Nogeoldae eonhae, was published in 1670 by the Bureau of Interpreters. It has the same Chinese text as the Beonyeok Nogeoldae, but the right readings and translations were updated to contemporary Korean.

During the Qing dynasty, the Chinese text was revised again as the Nogeoldae Sinseok ( "New edition of the 'Old Cathayan'"), which was published in 1761. The revision is attributed to one Byeon Hon, who went to Beijing in 1760 with the official delegation. A corresponding revised commentary, the Nogeoldae sinseok eonhae, was published in 1763 but is no longer extant.

The Junggan Nogeoldae ( "Reprinted 'Old Cathayan'") appeared in 1795, with a corresponding commentary Junggan Nogeoldae eonhae.  Its Chinese text is less colloquial than the earlier versions.

Translations 

Translations of the Nogeoldae into other languages were also published by the Bureau of Interpreters. The Cheong-eo Nogeoldae (淸語老乞大 "Manchu 'Old Cathayan'") includes Manchu text along with Hangul pronunciation and Korean translations. It was written by Choe Hutaek and others and published in 1704 and revised in 1765. I Choedae made a Mongolian edition called the Mong-eo Nogeoldae (蒙語老乞大 "Mongolian 'Old Cathayan'") that was published in 1741 and revised in 1766 and 1790.
A textbook list included in an edict of 1669 mentions a Japanese translation, but it is no longer extant.

See also 
	
 Ch'ŏphae Sinŏ

Notes

References 

Works cited

Further reading

External links 
 
 
 Joseon dynasty texts at the Academy of Korean Studies, including Beonyeok Nogeoldae, Nogeoldae eonhae, Cheong-eo Nogeoldae, Mong-eo Nogeoldae and Junggan Nogeoldae.
 Texts at the Internet Archive:
 Junggan Nogeoldae
 Junggan Nogeoldae eonhae, vol. 1, vol. 2
 Text based on the Nogeoldae eonhae

14th-century books
18th-century books
Chinese-language education
Joseon dynasty works
Korean language
Manchu language
Mongolian language
Old Mandarin